Ilija Lončarević (born 8 October 1944) is a Croatian professional football manager and former player who was most recently the manager of Croatian Second Football League club Kustošija.

Managerial career
Lončarević led Inker Zaprešić to the Croatian Cup title in 1992, but his arguably biggest success in management came when he won the Croatian League with Croatia Zagreb in 1999. In the 1990s, Lončarević was also in charge of several other Croatian teams including NK Zagreb, Marsonia, Slaven Belupo and Hrvatski Dragovoljac.

In the summer of 2000, after a short spell with Marsonia, Lončarević was appointed head coach at Čakovec, who just won their first promotion to the Croatian first division at the time, and led the club through the first part of the 2000–01 season. Under his management, Čakovec surprisingly came in position to fight for the fifth place in the Croatian league for some time during the autumn of 2000; they finished the season in 8th place. Lončarević left Čakovec in the winter break of the 2000–01 season and returned to Dinamo Zagreb for the 2001–02 season. 

In 2003, Lončarević was appointed head coach of the Libya national football team and led the team through their qualifying campaign for the 2006 World Cup. He was surprisingly sacked from the post in July 2004, although the team only lost one qualifying match until that time. After this first spell with the Libya national team, Lončarević went on to take charge of Dinamo Zagreb in November 2004 and stayed there until the end of the season. In April 2005, however, Lončarević was appointed head coach of the Libya national team for a second time, after their previous coach, Mohamed El Khemisy, resigned from the post following a 4–1 defeat to Egypt in the World Cup qualifiers. 

Lončarević then led the Libyan team through their remaining four World Cup qualifiers, but did not have much of success as the team managed two goalless draws and suffered two 1–0 defeats. Libya finished fourth in their group, 10 points behind the group winners Ivory Coast. Despite the unsuccessful World Cup qualifying campaign, Lončarević remained in charge of the Libyan team for the 2006 African Cup of Nations. However, after Libya lost to Egypt and Ivory Coast in their first two group matches at the tournament, chairman of the Libyan Football Federation, Gamal Al Gaafari, announced that the coach will be relieved of his duties after the last group match against Morocco, which ended in a goalless draw.
 
Since November 2006, Lončarević had been in charge of Croatian first division team Osijek. The team finished sixth in the league during his first season there and in May 2007 he signed a contract to end with the finish of the 2008–09. In his second season with Osijek, in 2007–08, the team finished third in the league and qualified for the 2008 UEFA Intertoto Cup.

In summer 2009 Lončarević was put on charge of KF Tirana champions of Albanian Superliga. However, on 6 October 2009, barely 5 weeks after the start of the Albanian Superliga, Lončarević gave his resignations without citing any reasons why he did that.

On 8 March 2021, he was appointed head coach again at Inter Zaprešić, today a Croatian second division team. He resigned at Kustošija in October 2022.

Managerial statistics

Honours
Inter Zaprešić
Croatian Cup: 1992

Marsonia
Druga HNL – North: 1993–94
Druga HNL: 1999–2000

Slaven Belupo
Druga HNL – North: 1995–96

Dinamo Zagreb
Prva HNL: 1998–99
Croatian Cup: 2001

Tirana 
Albanian Super Cup: 2009

References

External links
 
BBC article on Ilija Lončarević

1944 births
Living people
Yugoslav football managers
Croatian football managers
NK Zagreb managers
NK Inter Zaprešić managers
NK Marsonia managers
NK Slaven Belupo managers
HNK Orijent managers
NK Hrvatski Dragovoljac managers
GNK Dinamo Zagreb managers
Libya national football team managers
2006 Africa Cup of Nations managers
NK Osijek managers
NK Lokomotiva Zagreb managers
KF Tirana managers
HNK Gorica managers
HAŠK managers
Croatian Football League managers
Kategoria Superiore managers
Croatian expatriate football managers
Expatriate football managers in Libya
Croatian expatriate sportspeople in Libya
Expatriate football managers in Albania
Croatian expatriate sportspeople in Albania